V1369 Centauri also known as Nova Centauri 2013 was a bright nova in the constellation Centaurus that occurred in 2013. It was discovered on December 2, 2013 by amateur astronomer John  in Australia with a magnitude of 5.5.
On December 14, 2013 it peaked at about magnitude 3.3, making it the brightest nova so far of this millennium.

Nova Centauri 2013 was observed emitting gamma-rays between 7–10 December 2013 by the Fermi Gamma-ray Space Telescope. The nova continued to brighten in gamma-rays and the peak coincided with the second optical maximum on 11 December 2013.

The Swift Gamma-Ray Burst Mission detected X-ray emission from Nova Centauri 2013 on 18 and 25 February 2014 and 8 March 2014.

In July 2015 it was announced that lithium has been detected in material ejected from Nova Centauri 2013. This is the first time lithium has been detected in a nova system. The amount detected was less than a billionth of the mass of the Sun. This finding is significant because it supports a theory that the extra lithium found in Population I stars (compared to Population II stars) comes from novae.

See also
 List of novae in the Milky Way galaxy

References

 Central Bureau for Astronomical Telegrams – Transient Object Followup Reports – PNV J13544700-5909080

External links
 Naked-Eye Nova in Centaurus
 Light Curve Generator: AAVSO Data for Nova CEN 2013
International Variable Star Index

Centauri 2013, Nova
PNV J13544700-5909080
Centauri, V1369
20131202